Mecomma is a genus of plant bugs in the family Miridae. There are more than 30 described species in Mecomma.

Species
These 34 species belong to the genus Mecomma:

 Mecomma ambulans (Fallén, 1807)
 Mecomma amicus (Distant, 1909)
 Mecomma angustata (Uhler, 1895)
 Mecomma angustatum (Uhler, 1895)
 Mecomma angusticollis Linnavuori, 1973
 Mecomma antennata Van Duzee, 1917
 Mecomma antennatum Van Duzee, 1917
 Mecomma bradora Kelton, 1960
 Mecomma capitata Liu & Zheng, 1993
 Mecomma chinensis Reuter, 1906
 Mecomma crassicornis Liu & Yamamoto, 2004
 Mecomma dispar (Boheman, 1852)
 Mecomma filius (Distant, 1910)
 Mecomma fumida Linnavuori, 1975
 Mecomma gansuana Liu & Zheng, 1993
 Mecomma gilvipes (Stal, 1858)
 Mecomma grandis Carvalho & Southwood, 1955
 Mecomma imitambulans Liu & Yamamoto, 2004
 Mecomma japonica Miyamoto, 1966
 Mecomma juno Linnavuori, 1994
 Mecomma kharon Linnavuori, 1994
 Mecomma khrysothemis Linnavuori, 1994
 Mecomma lodosi Onder, 1979
 Mecomma lushuiensis Liu & Yamamoto, 2004
 Mecomma madagascariensis Reuter, 1892
 Mecomma opaca Liu & Zheng, 1993
 Mecomma orientalis Carvalho & Southwood, 1955
 Mecomma pervinius Onder, 1974
 Mecomma rectangulus (Ghauri, 1970)
 Mecomma ruficeps Linnavuori, 1994
 Mecomma ruwenzoriense Ghauri, 1964
 Mecomma shaanxiensis Liu & Yamamoto, 2004
 Mecomma stenata Liu & Yamamoto, 2004
 Mecomma xiongi Liu & Yamamoto, 2004

References

Further reading

External links

 

Miridae genera
Articles created by Qbugbot
Orthotylini